VanFest is an annual music festival which takes place in Maple Valley, Washington, United States. It was founded in 2011 as a grassroots project by namesake Van Wolfe, who was a student at Tahoma Senior High School at the time and described in The Stranger as a "superhuman". The event series, featuring largely Pacific Northwest local bands, benefits the Maple Valley food bank. VanFest Five, held in 2015, boasted four stages and 36 bands performing. VanFest 2016 featured three stages along with a hip hop tent.

Notable performers 
Willis Earl Beal (2014)
Jason Webley (2014)
Car Seat Headrest (2015)
MC Lars (2016)
Kitty (2015)

References

External links 
 

Music festivals established in 2011
Hip hop music festivals in the United States
Indie rock festivals
Music festivals in Washington (state)